Pio may refer to:

Places
 Pio Lake, Italy
 Pio Island, Solomon Islands
 Pio Point, Bird Island, south Atlantic Ocean

People
 Pio (given name)
 Pio (surname)
 Pio (footballer, born 1986), Brazilian footballer
 Pio (footballer, born 1988), Brazilian footballer

PIO
 Programmed input–output, a method of computer data transmission
 Public information officer of a government department
 Person of Indian Origin not living in India
 Pilot-induced oscillation, an undesirable phenomenon in aircraft control

Other uses
 Pio, prefix of 250 octets, a unit of information in computer science

See also 
 Pi O or П. O., Greek-Australian poet born 1951